Mrs. Leffingwell's Boots is a 1918 American silent comedy film directed by Walter Edwards and starring Constance Talmadge, Harrison Ford and George Fisher.

Cast
 Constance Talmadge as Mrs. Leffingwell 
 Harrison Ford as Mr. Leffingwell 
 George Fisher as Walter Huntley 
 Vera Doria as Mrs. Tom Brown 
 Fred Goodwins as Aleck Brown 
 Mercedes Temple as Wilhelmina 
 Herbert Prior as Mr. Tom Brown 
 Julia Faye as Mabel Brown

References

Bibliography
 Goble, Alan. The Complete Index to Literary Sources in Film. Walter de Gruyter, 1999.

External links

1918 films
1918 comedy films
Silent American comedy films
Films directed by Walter Edwards
American silent feature films
1910s English-language films
American black-and-white films
Selznick Pictures films
1910s American films